The 2017 Canberra Challenger is a professional tennis tournament played on outdoor hard courts. It is the second edition of the tournament, which is a part of the 2017 ATP Challenger Tour. It takes place in Canberra, Australia, between 9 and 14 January 2017.

Singles main-draw entrants

Seeds

 1 Rankings are as of January 2, 2017.

Other entrants
The following players received wildcards into the singles main draw:
 Andrew Harris
 Alexei Popyrin
 Calum Puttergill
 Brandon Walkin

The following players received entry from the qualifying draw:
 James Frawley
 Luca Margaroli
 Nathan Pasha
 Yusuke Watanuki

The following player received entry as a lucky loser:
  Jake Delaney

Champions

Men's singles

  Dudi Sela def.  Jan-Lennard Struff 3–6, 6–4, 6–3.

Men's doubles

  Andre Begemann /  Jan-Lennard Struff def.  Carlos Berlocq /  Andrés Molteni 6–3, 6–4.

External links
Official Website
 ATP Challenger Tour official site

2017 ATP Challenger Tour
Can
2017 in Australian tennis